Zoi Kontogianni (born 19 September 1997) is a Greek rhythmic gymnast. She competed in the group rhythmic gymnastics competition at the 2016 Summer Olympics, where the team was eliminated in the qualification round.

References

Living people
1997 births
Greek rhythmic gymnasts
Gymnasts at the 2016 Summer Olympics
Olympic gymnasts of Greece
European Games competitors for Greece
Gymnasts at the 2015 European Games
20th-century Greek women
21st-century Greek women